Ebony is a dense black/brown hardwood, coming from several species in the genus Diospyros, which also contains the persimmons. Unlike most woods, ebony is dense enough to sink in water. It is finely textured and has a mirror finish when polished, making it valuable as an ornamental wood. The word ebony comes from the Ancient Egyptian , through the Ancient Greek , into Latin and Middle English.

Species 
Species of ebony include Diospyros ebenum (Ceylon ebony), native to southern India and Sri Lanka; D. crassiflora (Gabon ebony), native to western Africa; D. humilis (Queensland ebony), native to Queensland, the Northern Territory, New Guinea and Timor; and D. celebica (Sulawesi ebony), native to Indonesia and prized for its luxuriant, multi-colored wood grain. Mauritius ebony, D. tessellaria, was largely exploited by the Dutch in the 17th century. Some species in the genus yield an ebony with similar physical properties, but striped rather than the even black of D. ebenum.

Uses 

Ebony has a long history of use, and carved pieces have been found in Ancient Egyptian tombs.

By the end of the 16th century, fine cabinets for the luxury trade were made of ebony in Antwerp. The wood's dense hardness lent itself to refined moldings framing finely detailed pictorial panels with carving in very low relief (bas-relief), usually of allegorical subjects, or with scenes taken from classical or Christian history. Within a short time, such cabinets were also being made in Paris, where their makers became known as ébénistes, which remains the French term for a cabinetmaker.

Modern uses are largely restricted to small items, such as crucifixes, the main body of some musical instruments such as the clarinet, oboe, or piccolo and musical instrument parts, including black piano, organ, and harpsichord keys; violin, viola, mandolin, guitar, double bass, and cello fingerboards; tailpieces; tuning pegs; chinrests; and bow frogs. Many plectrums, or guitar picks, are made from ebony.

Traditionally, black chess pieces were made from ebony, with boxwood or ivory being used for the white pieces. Modern East Midlands-style lace-making bobbins, also being small, are often made of ebony and look particularly decorative when bound with brass or silver wire. Some expensive handgun grips and rifle fore-end tips are still made of ebony, as are the butts of pool cues.

As a result of unsustainable harvesting, many species yielding ebony are now considered threatened. Most indigenous ebony in Africa in particular has been cut down illegally.

Protection
In Sri Lanka, ebony is a protected species and harvesting and sale of ebony is illegal and punishable by imprisonment.

In 2011, the Gibson Guitar company was raided by the US Fish and Wildlife Service for violations of the Lacey Act of 1900, which prohibits the illegal importation of threatened woods and other materials.

An ebony and rosewood expert at the Missouri Botanical Garden calls the Madagascar wood trade the "equivalent of Africa's blood diamonds".

Gallery

See also 
 African Blackwood
 Calamander wood
 Ebonite
 Ebonol
 Illegal logging in Madagascar

References

External links 

 Red List – For recommendations found under the IUCN

Diospyros
Ebony
Wood